Jane Marie Heffernan is a Canadian mathematician. Her research focuses on understanding the spread and persistence of infectious diseases. She is a full professor at York University and a Tier 2 York Research Chair in Multi-Scale Quantitative Methods for Evidence-Based Health Policy. She is the director of the Centre for Disease Modelling (CDM), and is on the board of directors of the Canadian Applied and Industrial Mathematics Society (CAIMS).

Early life and career
As a youth, Heffernan decided she enjoyed studying mathematics and decided to pursue a career as a math teacher. She earned her undergraduate degree in mathematics and computer science from Trent University before completing her master's degree at Queen's.

Career
Heffernan joined the York University faculty in 2007. She was also named director of the Centre for Disease Modelling.

In 2014, Heffernan and fellow York University professor Derek Wilson co-authored a paper titled "The Undead: A Plague on Mankind or a Powerful New Tool for Epidemiological Research." In 2015, she was appointed a York Research Chair. As a result of her research in the Modelling Infection & Immunity Lab, she also won the CAIMS-PIMS Early Career Award. The next year, York University recognized her as a research leader.

In 2018, Heffernan, Joel D. Katz, and Paul Ritvo co-analyzed a pain management app that claimed to identify and forecast changes in pain experiences of users.

Awards
Heffernan has received awards including: Governor Generals Gold Medal, NSERC Postdoctoral Fellowship (Warwick, UK), NSERC University Faculty Award, MRI Ontario Early Researcher Award, and the Petro-Canada Young Innovators Award.

References

External links

Living people
Trent University alumni
Queen's University at Kingston alumni
Academic staff of York University
Canadian mathematicians
Women mathematicians
Year of birth missing (living people)
Canadian women mathematicians